Por Esto! (English: "That's Why!") is a daily Mexican newspaper headquartered in Mérida, Yucatán. It has offices in Cancún, Quintana Roo, and several bureaus. It largely covers the Mexican states of Yucatán, Campeche, and Quintana Roo, giving it significant circulation.

In 1997, a series of investigative articles implicated Roberto Hernandez Ramirez, then the general-director of Mexican bank Banamex, as a narcotrafficker. Both Por Esto and Narco News were unsuccessfully sued for libel.

See also
 List of newspapers in Mexico

References

External links 
Por Esto!

Publications with year of establishment missing
Newspapers published in Mexico
Mass media in Mérida, Yucatán
Spanish-language newspapers